The women's 80 metres hurdles event at the 1932 Olympic Games took place between August 3 and August 4 at the Los Angeles Memorial Coliseum.

Results
Top three from each of the two heats qualified for the finals.

Heats
First heat

Heat 2

Final

Key: WR = World record; DNF = did not finish

References

Athletics at the 1932 Summer Olympics
Sprint hurdles at the Olympics
1932 in women's athletics
Ath